The Iowa flood of 2008 was a hydrological event involving most of the rivers in eastern Iowa which began June 8 and continued until July 1. Flooding continued on the Upper Mississippi River in the southeastern area of the state for many more days. The phrase "Iowa's Katrina" was often heard.

The flooding included (from north to south, east to west), the Upper Iowa River, Turkey, and the Maquoketa Rivers; outside of the Driftless Area, they include the catchments of the Wapsipinicon River and that of the Iowa River, to include the latter's major tributary, the Cedar River (and its significant tributaries); and the Skunk River in its various forks. The Des Moines River had some minor flooding, but floodwalls and levees, for the most part, held fast. The Upper Mississippi River, which receives the outflow from all these rivers, remained at the flood stage.

The flooding of Cedar Rapids and Iowa City were the most significant events. Recovery, in particular for Cedar Rapids, is considered to be a protracted and costly affair. For Iowa City, the level of damage was less than expected, but that of Cedar Rapids was greater than anticipated. In Iowa City, the campus of the University of Iowa was vulnerable, and serious flooding did occur there.

President George W. Bush landed on Air Force One at The Eastern Iowa Airport on June 20. He toured on foot and by helicopter the Cedar Rapids and Iowa City region. On the same day, Senator John McCain made a stop in Columbus Junction.

Origins
State Meteorologist Elwynn Taylor of Iowa State University commented that the wet spring of 2008 was traceable to relatively warm and wet air during the winter season.  Taylor explained:

"Fog in the winter is normally the result of a strong flow of warm, moist air from the Gulf of Mexico, which normally does not occur in the winter," he said. "Usually that occurs in March and April. It's caused by either low pressure over New Mexico or high pressure over Bermuda. Both are common in the summer. Both are rare in the winter. More than 80 percent of moisture that falls in the Midwest is from the Gulf of Mexico, and the primary cause of it coming here is the Bermuda high pressure. The pressure arrived very early and much stronger than usual by April and May this year. And it was the case in 1993."

Taylor was quoted at length in the article, concluding: "[The] Rule of thumb is, if a storm begins in the Texas Panhandle, it will come to Iowa. The conditions that allow a storm to develop there are the conditions that move the storm to Iowa."

From the last week in April, the state experienced heavy rain, particularly in the form of thunderstorms, which saturated the soils. It was an extension of the Late-May 2008 tornado outbreak sequence, which aside from record-setting tornadoes, also brought huge quantities of rain in the form of stalled thunderstorm systems.

Another possible, contributing factor was the extensive field tiling (installation of drain tile) in Iowa. Almost 40% of agricultural fields in Iowa are tiled, which allows water to flow more quickly from fields into waterways, possibly causing water levels to rise faster.

Also, farming closer to creeks and rivers, without adequate buffer strips, allows the water to move rapidly from the field directly to the surface water.

Effects

While the Great Flood of 1993 was greater in continental terms, in local Iowa terms, the June 2008 Midwest floods were considerably worse. The lessons learned in 1993, however, helped prevent or otherwise mitigate damage, extensive as it was; one example is how the city of Des Moines raised its levee around its domestic water and sewage treatment plants. The extent of flooding in 2008 was probably less than during the Flood of 1851, but it is difficult to compare impacts of the two floods because of changes in population, economy, and land use. A study performed by Mark Burton at the University of Tennessee and Michael J. Hicks at Ball State University was based on post 1993 flood data.  However, the 2008 floods damaged key infrastructure outside of the model (e.g. the University of Iowa library) due both to changes in population and flood protection measures.  However, the Burton & Hicks study did identify crop damages at roughly $3 billion, which turned out to be very close to the actual damages.

The flooding led to many homes being evacuated. In eastern Iowa along the Iowa River and Cedar River, flooding exceeded that of the Flood of 1993.

Flooding had also forced the closure of an extensive number of roads throughout the eastern half of the state, a situation that affected far more people than those who directly experienced the floods; in particular, portions of Interstate 80 and I-380 were closed. The closure of bridges in Waterloo, Cedar Rapids and Iowa City disrupted usual traffic patterns, and especially led to extensive detours.

Rail traffic was also seriously affected. The Iowa, Chicago and Eastern Railroad (IC&E Railroad) had a washout between Mason City and Nora Springs. The Cedar Rapids and Iowa City Railway Co. (CRANDIC/CIC) was particularly affected; its bridge in Cedar Rapids was destroyed by the flooding while an embankment downriver near Coralville was also washed out. The Keokuk Junction Railway (KJRY) also reported disruptions. Amtrak service was rerouted, away from Iowa; a number of trains had their passengers put onto buses.

Restoration of Amtrak service
Amtrak's California Zephyr service (from Chicago) was suspended in Iowa due to substantial flooding. Because of the widespread flooding in Iowa, no detours were available and passengers were moved by motor coaches during the interim. The affected railways were owned by IC&E and BNSF. Service was projected to resume on July 5, 2008 for the California Zephyr. The two other routes previously closed by flooding resumed service on July 1.

Upper Iowa River

Decorah
On Monday, June 9 the Upper Iowa River in Decorah flooded when a shorter college-built levee was breached. The Army Corps of Engineers levee held in all parts of Decorah. The water flooded parts of the lower campus of Luther College, damaging athletic fields and the Regents Center. Winneshiek County officials called this the worst flood to occur in Decorah since the current levee system was put in place in the 1940s. Other portions of the city were flooded. Part of the city was evacuated. For a time, worries of losing the sanitary sewer system led to a 'please don't flush' order; as of Friday, June 13, 2008, this order was withdrawn, but pleas for careful use remained in effect. This article also alludes to a difficult cleanup facing Decorah as well as Winneshiek County.

Dorchester
Further downstream on the Upper Iowa, in the small historic unincorporated area of Dorchester, located on the left bank of the Waterloo Creek, severe flooding was experienced. In particular, a trailer court sustained major damage.

The flood began in the early morning of Sunday, June 8; residents were advised to evacuate that Saturday evening. Approximately seven to ten inches (254 mm) of rain fell in the area that Saturday. The main troublemaker was Waterloo Creek, a normally placid trout stream tributary to the Upper Iowa at Dorchester. The Eitzen, Minnesota Fire Department responded to the flood. Cleanup and recovery occurred during the aftermath.

Turkey River

Spillville and Fort Atkinson
Along the upper Turkey River, the historic towns of Spillville and Fort Atkinson experienced significant flooding, with damaged roads. In particular the one-year-old bridge carrying Iowa Highway 24 had its approach on one side of the river washed out by floodwaters.

Elkader
 The river had retreated by Thursday, June 12

By June 16, most of the water had been pumped out of buildings. At "least 20 homes were destroyed and nine suffered major damage".

Damages were initially estimated to be in the range of $8 million, of which about $3.7 million in damage to the city's infrastructure; these figures are expected to rise.  About 100 people evacuated.

Maquoketa River
In the Maquoketa's upper area, Monticello experienced high water.

Manchester
Downtown alone has been hit four times. Supersaturated soil led to basement flooding.

Wapsipinicon River

Independence
Independence experienced flooding in low-lying areas.

Anamosa
A levee breach occurred in Anamosa on Thursday, June 12. While the flooding was not extensive, it nonetheless knocked out the city's sewer treatment facility.

The cost of putting the sewer system back to full function was $3 million; initial filtering, however, was expected to come back on line by the second week of August.

Olin and Oxford Junction
Oxford Junction managed to protect its water plant as well as the American Legion hall. Upriver, Olin suffered flooding in low-lying areas but the waters were receding by June 15.

Olin sustained about $80,000 in damage. At least 80 homes sustained damage.

With Oxford Junction, the nearby Cooksville area had about 30 homes evacuated. The city sustained damage to the road leading to the sewer treatment facility.

De Witt
De Witt sits above the Wapsi, between two minor tributaries of the river. Areas outside the city are expected to flood, and some sandbagging is in progress.

Iowa River
The Iowa River has as its major tributary the Cedar River.

Iowa City-Coralville

Downstream, the Iowa continued to rise, progressively inundating portions of Coralville and Iowa City. Smaller local tributaries added to the problem, particularly in Iowa City along Ralston Creek and in Coralville along Clear Creek.

By Saturday, June 14, the river had seriously risen. Warnings were issued for people to prepare to evacuate from the 500-year-flood floodplain. The University had time to prepare, moving important library collections and millions of dollars of artwork out of harms way, through the help of volunteers. The bookstore in the student union had its contents moved to higher ground. The University's electrical power plant was shut down on Saturday, June 14 as sections of it began to take on water.

In Coralville, the washout of the embankment holding the tracks of the Cedar Rapids and Iowa City Railroad and subsequent high water severely compromised the city's access to Iowa City.  The DOT decided to close US Highway 6 in two places in the area; one in downtown Coralville and the other in Iowa City at the intersection of Highway 6 and Iowa Highway 1.

A reported sixteen buildings on the University of Iowa campus were flooded, including Hancher Auditorium; this number was later upped to at least twenty. There were over 6 million sandbags filled in Johnson County, which is more than were filled during Hurricane Katrina, and is a national record.

The Arts Campus was particularly affected. The University of Iowa School of Art and Art History Art Building and Art Building West were heavily damaged by the flood. Hancher Auditorium took on floodwaters up to the stage level and into the middle of the main floor seats. The Voxman Music Building was filled up to the first floor level. The Theater Building was also significantly damaged by the flood. The University of Iowa Museum of Art was significantly damaged and the building was rendered uninsurable by Lloyds's of London, the art insurer (which means the art collection can never return to this site). On the east side of the river, the Adler Journalism Building, the Becker Communications Study Building all had water in their basements. The main library had only minor flooding, and then only in its basement. The Iowa Memorial Union took on water in its basement and first floor. Mayflower residence hall, home to about 1,000 students during the school year, took water into its underground parking and utility areas as well as into parts of the first floor. At one time, the dorm was projected to remain closed for at least a semester, if not for the whole 2008–2009 academic year.  However, the damages to the building were not as significant as once thought and Mayflower opened for the 2008–09 school year. The campus has miles of utility tunnels, some of them crossing under the river, and maintaining electrical and air conditioning service was a fragile thing. Summer courses resumed Monday, June 23.

Hills
Hills is about six miles (10 km) downstream from Iowa City. The town heavily sandbagged over that weekend, and there were hopes that the water would spread out into open farmland and spare the town.  The hopes came true and there were a few flooded basements.  The town was featured on ABC's World News Sunday on June 15.  A reporter interviewed Mayor Russ Bailey.  The report showed people sandbagging in front of the city maintenance building.

Wapello
Wapello, county seat of Louisa County experienced a levee breach and residents were evacuated as a precaution. A few homes and farmland were destroyed, but the town was kept mostly safe due to its higher elevation and no one in  the town was injured or killed by the flood as a result.

Oakville

Oakville is the last town on the Iowa River before it empties into the Mississippi. The authorities believed it would be in danger when the river crested and had issued an evacuation order to take effect on Monday, June 16. However, in the early morning of June 14 a river levee near the town failed catastrophically, resulting in an immediate emergency evacuation order. In an interview with NPR, the mayor of Oakville recounted that she was in the town hall with members of the National Guard when the town's fire chief drove up to the building and started shouting, "The levee's breaking, get out, get out now."

Within hours, most of the town was submerged under several feet of water and remained flooded for days. As of July 1, the levee was still open to the river, and water was still passing through it. The Corps of Engineers has constructed a rock and earthen temporary levee, but the town's future remains uncertain as almost all of the buildings were damaged or destroyed, almost none of the residents carried flood insurance, and repairs on the permanent levee have been delayed due to discovered pottery fragments.

Cedar River
A number of cities, and rural areas, suffered serious flooding, the most extreme being that in Cedar Rapids.

Charles City
Charles City experienced the earliest flooding on the Cedar, starting on Sunday, June 9. It is reported as the worst flood in the city's history. The city's historic suspension bridge was swept away.

Waverly

More than 2500 people were evacuated. Much of the town was inundated with many homes and businesses experiencing flood damage. In the flood's aftermath 151 homes were reported to be flood – impacted, with 69 of the properties eventually being bought out by the city. Since the floods of 2008, Waverly has been made an official forecast point to better help with predicting river crest levels and impact information – information that was not available during the floods of 2008. In 2011, Waverly completed the construction of a 4.3 million dollar inflatable dam. The dam is designed to protect more than 400 homes and businesses in the event of a 100-year flood and will provide relief in 500-year flood events such as 2008.

Cedar Falls-Waterloo
Cedar Falls, home of the University of Northern Iowa, is on the west bank of the Cedar River, and north of Waterloo, which occupies both banks of the river.

Hundreds of homes in Waterloo and north Cedar Falls were underwater, along with Waterloo's downtown. This led to the closing of the bridges, cutting the city in half. The Waterloo Courier lost the use of its printing plant but continued printing by courtesy of the Cedar Rapids Gazette.   As of June 7, 2012, 150 homes in northern Cedar Falls were bought out as part of the flood recovery. http://wcfcourier.com/app/special/flood_buyout/

On the morning of Wednesday, June 11, television news station KWWL was knocked off the air by a "flood-related" power outage but regained power by the afternoon by using a generator.  Then on the night of Monday, June 16, at about 9:30, KWWL lost power, putting them off the air, and had a small electrical fire in a part of their building.  An electric motor burned and sent smoke through the building. They were able to resume broadcasts around 1:00 Tuesday morning.

After three floods in the 1960s, Waterloo and Cedar Falls spent years building levees and flood gates along the Cedar River and two of its tributaries. During the flood of 2008, water became trapped behind those levees and was kept from returning to the river. The City of Waterloo is now investing in pump stations to pump out water from behind the dikes in the event of future flooding.

La Porte City
La Porte City had earlier suffered a significant flood at the end of May. By June 10, the city braced for a second onslaught.

Vinton
The flood knocked out the municipal electrical generating plant, inundating about 15 blocks along the river. The Benton County jail had to be evacuated. The sheriff's office was inundated, as was the basement, where 911 dispatchers were housed.

Palo
The small town of Palo, just upstream from Cedar Rapids, and home of Iowa's only nuclear power plant, underwent a mandatory evacuation. The nuclear plant was not harmed, but did lose land-based telephone service, as the land lines were routed through Palo.

On Wednesday, June 11, the city completely evacuated all of its 980 citizens. All road access was later cut off, and the city went completely underwater. Around 90% of the structures in the community had damage from water. People were supposed to return to their homes on June 15, but were delayed by hazards such as contamination due to the flood and floating propane tanks. By Tuesday, June 17, it was reported that residents had for the most part returned home to deal with damage. Some buildings were more damaged than others; some had only a flooded basement to deal with, but for others, the water reached up to the first floor level.

About a month after the flood mayor Terry Sanders resigned and Jeff Beauregard was appointed as the interim mayor. Beauregard has been recognized for his flood recovery efforts, winning the 2008 Iowa League of Cities Rhonda Wood Johnson award, amongst others. The community has been recognized as a model for flood recovery efforts. Due to expedited recovery efforts and processes such as temporary occupancy permits, as of January 1, a majority of Palo residents were back into their homes. The city passed a one cent sales tax in March 2009 with an 82% approval to deal with the community's recovery.

Cedar Rapids

Cedar Rapids began to be affected by the Cedar River on Monday, June 9. Ellis Boulevard NW near Ellis Park closed due to flood water. Water was nearly over the access road to the Ellis boat harbor on that Monday evening. By Tuesday morning, June 10, 2008, Edgewood Road from Glass Road NE to O Ave NW (including the bridge) was closed as flood waters overtook the western section of the roadway near the City Gardens area.

Mid American Energy began terminating natural gas service to the Time Check and Osbourne Park neighborhoods of northwest Cedar Rapids around 5 p.m. on Tuesday, June 10. Alliant Energy reported that electrical service to the Time Check area would be terminated. However, power still had not been terminated by Wednesday, June 11 at 6:00 p.m.

Cedar Rapids, Iowa was one of, if not the hardest hit area during the floods of 2008. The Cedar River crested at 31.12 ft (19 feet above flood stage) at 10:15 am on Friday, June 13, 2008, with the flood waters expected to fully retreat by June 24, barring any more heavy rains.

The 1st Street NW Time Check Levee, built in the 1930s after the Great Flood of 1929 (20 ft crest), was completely submerged by the Cedar River, according to a KCRG-TV video captured on the morning of Thursday, June 12, 2008. A homeowner measured from the waterline on his house to a point equal to the top of the levee using a laser level and discovered that the levee had been under approximately 56 inches (4.5 feet) of water.

About 1,300 blocks or 10 square miles, including most of the downtown area, were inundated, with more than 5,000 homes being affected. Mays Island (which included the Cedar Rapids city hall, the Linn County courthouse, the county jail, and the federal courthouse) was flooded up to the second floor level. Buildings that did not suffer any first floor damage had flooded basements. The Czech Village, Time Check, and Cedar Valley/Rompot districts in particular sustained significant damage. The city's domestic water distribution was compromised, as all but one of the city's wells were flooded, and water usage restrictions were imposed; however through a massive sandbagging effort the city's last remaining well was kept operational throughout the disaster. The river dropped faster than previously expected.

Linn County moved most of its government offices, including the county courts, to the campus of Kirkwood Community College and later to a former Montgomery Ward store in Westdale Mall.

Tremendous disruption to the city's utilities occurred. Electricity was cut off to the flooded parts of the city by the power company, Alliant Energy,  as was natural gas; telephone and internet service was also disrupted.

As the waters receded, flooded buildings were inspected by "strike teams" before owners were allowed to return and check out the damage. They used a color-coded system. Green meant the building was safe for occupancy, yellow meant entry should be limited and at one's own risk, red indicated serious damage/no entry, and purple was later used for buildings which were to be demolished. In biggest problems with homes were collapsing basements or foundations. In cases where water had reached the first floor or higher, there was failure of the floor joists, leading to a sagging or collapse into the basement. The Time Check neighborhood is particularly hard hit, where several hundred homes were said to be beyond salvation and will be demolished.

On the third anniversary of the disaster (June 12, 2011), Cedar Rapids was still rebuilding from the largest flood to ever hit. The City was yet to rebuild the main branch of its public library, the new federal courthouse was under construction, and the City government was in  process of moving back to May's Island. These projects have since been completed. The iconic Dairy Queen on 1st Ave downtown is gone, along with several hundred homes that were razed, and many businesses that were not able to recover. On June 13, 2011, the replica of The Statue of Liberty was rededicated on May's Island after being washed away by the flood.

Statistics
Houses damaged: 5,238 (parcels: 5,390)
Businesses damaged: 940 (parcels: 1,049)
Non-profits/faith organizations damaged: 77
City blocks affected: 1,300 (10 square miles)
River levels: Crest 31.12 feet June 13, 2008 at 10:15 am (flood stage 12 feet),
One month after crest: 8.66 feet,
Two months after crest: 4.43 feet,
Previous record crests: 20 feet in 1929 and 1951, 19.27 feet in 1993

Cultural losses

The Paramount Theatre, one of the city's premier cultural venues, was flooded up to the first floor. The 1928 Wurlitzer theater organ console was found to have floated up onto the stage and the wood of the console said to be a total loss.  The historic theater had recently completed an extensive restoration project prior to the flood.  In July 2009, the city indicated that they had selected an architect to direct the reconstruction of the theater. While the interior of the building was heavily damaged, the structure of the theater remained relatively sound.

The African American Cultural Center and Museum took on water up to the first floor, and it remains to be seen how much of its 1,700 exhibits can be salvaged.

The National Czech & Slovak Museum & Library received water into the first floor area, with the loss of many artifacts and documents. The building was moved and elevated.

The first floor of the main branch of the Cedar Rapids Public Library was filled with floodwater. With a collection of books said to be about 290,000, the entire adult section was lost, as was the reference section. The children's collection, however, was located on the unflooded second floor. Plans to expand the building and to increase the library levy were shelved. On July 3, 2008, the library's director stated that the main branch may not reopen for at least three years, with the possibility open of moving to a new location altogether. In the meantime, the library leased additional space at Westdale Mall, where it already operated a branch.  FEMA would not pay for rebuilding the main branch on the current, flood-prone site, so a property swap was effected with a commercial property owner away from the river; the new owner paid for renovation, and FEMA paid for a new library across the square from the city art museum. In 2013, the downtown branch of the library was completed by OPN Architects, a regional design firm located in Cedar Rapids. The project has received many awards in library design and construction by the American Library Association and American Institute of Architects.

The Helen G. Nassif YMCA was badly damaged, with an estimated 7½ feet of water on the first floor. The  downtown facility was built in 2002 for a cost of $8 million.  Repair progressed quickly, and the facility has reopened..

The Mother Mosque of America, the oldest building in the United States built specifically for use as a mosque, had its basement flooded, ruining a century's worth of documents and artifacts..

Theatre Cedar Rapids' basement, stage, and a large part of the auditorium was flooded.  The Wurlitzer organ was heavily damaged and was rebuilt out of state; it is currently undergoing final installation before it is returned to use.  The theatre was able to return to its downtown location in February 2009 after a massive rebuilding and remodeling effort.

United States Courthouse

Congress had earlier authorized a new United States Courthouse to replace the current crowded, outdated building located on 1st Street SE. Both of Iowa's senators were said to be pushing hard to move up the appropriation necessary to build the new facility, as it makes little sense to repair the current flood-damaged building. As of 2013, construction has been completed on the new Cedar Rapids Federal Courthouse, and it is located across the street from the Helen G. Nassif YMCA on 8th Avenue Southeast.

Law enforcement

The flood greatly stressed the local police and sheriff's departments. Cedar Rapids Police Chief Greg Graham personally called Minneapolis Police Chief Tim Dolan and asked for emergency assistance. Graham's officers had been working for over twenty-four hours straight. Minneapolis sent the first contingent of officers headed by Deputy Chief Rob Allen. The state activated the National Guard and sent about 750 of them into the city. Members of the Iowa State Patrol, the Iowa Department of Public Safety, and the Iowa Division of Criminal Investigation responded. Sheriff's departments from other Iowa counties also sent manpower. The federal government also deployed agents from the Federal Bureau of Investigation, ATF, the Drug Enforcement Administration, and U.S. Immigration and Customs Enforcement. The Nebraska State Patrol and Lincoln, Nebraska Police Department sent officers.

Officers from the Twin Cities area also showed up, including members of the Hennepin County, Minnesota sheriff's office, and officers from the Minneapolis, Bloomington and Saint Paul police departments, as well as Minnesota state troopers. The Hennepin County Sheriff's Dept. also supplied a portable repeater to assist in radio communications.  The existing repeater had been knocked out by the flood waters.

The list of all agencies that deployed to assist in Cedar Rapids alone is as follows: ATF
Bloomington Minnesota Police, Cass County Iowa Sheriff, Decorah Iowa Police, Delaware County Iowa  Sheriff, DEA, FBI,  Hennepin County Minnesota Sheriff, ICE, Indianola Iowa Police, Iowa Air National Guard, Iowa Army National Guard, Iowa Department of Public Safety Enforcement, Iowa Division of Criminal Investigation, Iowa State Patrol, Iowa Navy Reserve, Jones County Iowa Sheriff, Lincoln Nebraska Police, Linn County Iowa Sheriff, Lisbon Iowa Police, Marion Iowa Police, Minneapolis Minnesota Police, Mt. Vernon Iowa Police, Nebraska State Police, Iowa Region 3 & 4 FUSION centers, St. Paul Minnesota Police, Toledo Iowa Police, US Coast Guard, US Department of Narcotics Enforcement, US Marshals Service, US Postal inspectors Police, US Treasury Department Enforcement, Warren County Iowa Sheriff, and West Branch Iowa Police

All of this extra help was used to man roadblocks and barricades.  Extra officers were also placed with Cedar Rapids Police officers to help patrol flood-affected areas, as well as handle excess calls for service generated by the flood.  It was reported that officers from St. Paul Minnesota Police were noted as handling routine calls such as bar-checks in Marion, as well as FBI and ICE agents responding with Toledo Iowa Police to burglary calls in Cedar Rapids.

The police department, located on the west bank of the river, was flooded and evacuated. By Friday, June 20, 2008, they had reoccupied the building as cleanup ensued.

Economic losses

Job losses were estimated to be in the 6,000–7,000 range. Officials urged those whose jobs were washed away by the flood to file for unemployment insurance, even those who might not be otherwise eligible, as disaster unemployment benefits were available.

Business losses were considerable. Many small businesses were essentially wiped out, particularly in the Czech Village area. The Cargill plant was expected to reopen rapidly. Archer Daniels Midland expected to get its plant back online by the end of June.

Quaker Oats is a major employer in Cedar Rapids. Mark Schiller, Quaker's president, said, "We've been here for 140 years and we'll be here for another 140 years." The plant has operated in Cedar Rapids since 1873. Schiller indicated that the plant was largely undamaged, and that the main impediment to full reopening was the lack of adequate electric service, as well as the fact that rail lines were closed.

Recovery
By Wednesday, June 18, the waters had receded greatly, leaving remnants only in the Time Check neighborhood on the west bank of the river and the Czech Village district, which lies on both sides of the river. Importantly, most bridges had been reopened, relieving the stress on the I-380 which had been the only crossing that remained open (and only then with severe restrictions on who could cross). While downtown became accessible, power remained off, and traffic signals were out; this is because transformers in underground vaults were still receiving water. Water restrictions which imposed limits on use were also eased, and people were allowed the use of showers and washing machines.

By June 2013, some residents were still struggling with the consequences of the flood. For nearly all, a "new normal" had been found, including a new sense of community.

Sutliff
Flooding badly damaged the NRHP Sutliff Bridge at Sutliff.

Columbus Junction, Columbus City and Fredonia
Columbus Junction, Columbus City and Fredonia are all quite close to each other, at the confluence of the Cedar River and the Iowa River. Columbus Junction is located on the south bank of the Iowa. Columbus City is just south of Columbus Junction. Fredonia is on the north bank very close to the confluence of the rivers.

Early attempts at sandbagging in Columbus Junction were abandoned Saturday, June 14 when it was realized such efforts would be futile. Resources were then diverted to Oskaloosa, on the Skunk River.

Fredonia and parts of Columbus Junction and Columbus City were evacuated. Residents were allowed to return on June 16. Columbus Junction and Columbus City have water again, but were under a boil order.

Governor Chet Culver was flown into the area by Blackhawk helicopter on June 16. Louisa County received a presidential disaster declaration.

Tipton
Tipton is the seat of Cedar County. The county is reported to have had some damage, and the county was declared a presidential disaster area.

Skunk River

Colfax
Colfax is located east of northeastern Des Moines. By June 9, the South Skunk had risen sufficiently to start sandbagging.

U.S. Highway 61 was closed off five miles (8 km) south of Burlington due to the rising waters blocking off the road.

Oskaloosa
Oskaloosa is located between the South Skunk River and the Des Moines River just downstream from Lake Red Rock. National Guardsmen who had been designated for Columbus Junction were sent to Oskaloosa. Around 7 a.m. on Thursday June 12 sandbagging began in an effort to save the city's water plant. The sandbagging continued until noon when they were allowed to stop. Later in the day the Army Corps of Engineers ordered that they continue sandbagging. The sandbagging started up around 5 pm and continued late into the night. Musco Sports Lighting sent a portable lighting truck to help the volunteers see at overnight. The sandbagging continued until about noon on Friday June 13 when the sandbagging was allowed to cease. The frantic sandbagging saved the city's water plant.

Des Moines River

Des Moines
In Des Moines a levee breach flooded the Birdland Park neighborhood north of downtown. The river was past its crest by Friday, June 13, but advisories were still in effect.

In the morning hours of June 13, the Army Corps of Engineers called for a complete evacuation of a 100-year flood zone in downtown Des Moines, but the data used to call the evacuation turned out to be false because of a faulty water flow rate sensor. Residents returned to their homes by the end of the day.

Ottumwa
Ottumwa is downstream from Oskaloosa. An electrical substation was threatened. Elements from the Iowa National Guard's 334th Brigade Support Battalion and the 1st Battalion, 133rd Infantry, earlier deployed Cedar Falls and Oskaloosa, formed a human chain to successfully sandbag the facility.

Mississippi River
The Army Corps was forced to close the river to navigation, intermittently, from Lock and Dam No. 11 to Lock and Dam No. 25. As of Sunday, June 15, Locks 13 through 25 were closed, making  of the Mississippi River inaccessible to commercial river traffic. Mississippi River traffic resumed on Saturday, July 5, according to the Army Corps of Engineers, as the final lock to be cleared for operation, Lock 25, reopened Saturday morning.

Dubuque
Dubuque was not as severely affected as other Iowa cities.  Over the course of the flood, Dubuque experienced only occasional flash flooding on the Little Maquoketa River or Catfish Creek. Lock and Dam No. 11 had its floodgates opened by the Army Corps to prevent the dam being overtopped by flood stage waters.

Quad Cities

The Mississippi River topped the  flood stage in the Quad Cities on June 11, 2008. Davenport is the largest city bordering the Mississippi that has no permanent floodwall or levee. On June 12, 3.28 inches of rain fell in six hours at the Quad City International Airport courtesy of severe thunderstorms and high winds, breaking the record of rain fall, for that time period, adding major problems to the flooding. The rain caused not only Mississippi River flooding, but also flooding at Duck Creek. Duck Creek is a creek which winds through central Davenport. Duck Creek topped four feet over flood stage. Three of the seven main streets, including U.S. Route 61 which was being used as a detour for Interstate 80, that cross the creek were blocked off due to major flooding over the roads.
The YouTube article "Lightning Hitting the Ground/Flooded Mississippi" is one of several videotaping shots which relates to the severe thunderstorms which created the flooding at Duck Creek during Thursday, June 12 and Friday, June 13.

Burlington
In the city of Burlington, the river played havoc with national transportation.

In the early morning hours of May 1, 2008, five river barges came loose from their moorings at a staging area a short distance upstream of Burlington.  While two ran aground before they reached the city, the remaining three struck the far eastern pier of the Great River Bridge with minimal impact. The bridge was closed to traffic until later the same afternoon, after the Iowa Department of Transportation inspected it and found it structurally sound.  One of those barges continued downstream and became lodged under the Burlington Rail Bridge.   After two unsuccessful recovery attempts, the 140-year-old rail bridge was partially reopened the following morning with the barge still wedged beneath.

Flood waters caused the city to close off the area of the riverfront along Front Street to Main Street.  Several buildings along Main Street, including the county courthouse and the historic railroad depot, utilized several sandbags around the buildings in an attempt to keep the rising flood waters at bay.  Buildings as far west as Fourth Street (four blocks west of, and parallel to, the riverfront), and the historic fire station, were pumping out their basements due to the flood waters.

On the morning of June 10, all rail traffic was halted at the BNSF Bridge and rerouted to other, safer bridges, as the level of the river was just a little over five feet from the bottom of the tracks, and flood waters had begun to overtake the bridge's western approach into Iowa, by the morning of June 15, the river had placed itself to the bottom of the bridge, hiding all piers, and causing the bridge to appear as if it were simply resting on top of the water.

The city's rail yard, which runs parallel to the riverfront, began to experience flooding for the first time since the Flood of 1993 on the afternoon of June 12, as it encroached on their diversion spurs, and began to follow the tracks leading out of the city. By mid-afternoon on June 15, the entire yard had flooded out, by the morning of June 16, the flood waters were so deep in the rail yard, the tracks were no longer visible.

Several buildings along the waterfront, including Memorial Auditorium, and the historic Port of Burlington building, began sandbagging efforts early on the morning of June 11 to keep out the rising flood waters.

By the morning of June 12 the flood waters began to fill the parking lots of businesses along the riverfront, including the Port of Burlington and Memorial Auditorium, both of which sit at the river's edge, by the morning of June 16, both buildings had flooded up to the main floor, as the flood waters seeped through cracks between the sandbags, rendering the work that had been done to protect them useless, the outdoor stage that is connected to the south facade of the Port of Burlington building was not visible, nor were the access ramps that run along the entire western entrance. (the stage is built up five feet from ground level, and is made of concrete, the access ramps, and one raised sidewalk connects to it.)

During the afternoon of June 14, the city, as well as Des Moines County evacuated all residents living east of County Highway 99 due to a levee in the area threatening to fail. A bulge had been seen on one side of the levee, and water was pooling near the base on the dry side, by the early morning of June 16, three more bulges were discovered along the Tama Levee, the longest levee in the area, and one of only a handful of survivors from the Flood of 1993, this made workers in the area state that it was no longer a question of if, but when the levee would break.

One of the city's largest employers, Case Corporation, had been threatened with rising flood waters, due to its proximity to the riverfront, and due to the closeness to a levee that was severely damaged due to constant rains in the area, by the morning of June 15, Case had ceased all production, and ordered a shutdown of the plant, allowing workers to help in the sandbagging effort, surprisingly, the plant survived the flood unscathed, the fourth such flood it had withstood,(the building that houses the Case plant has stood in its current location since the late 1890s, first as Shower Brothers furniture. The plant, as Case, became operational in 1937, and withstood the floods of 1965, 1973, and 1993.)

By the early evening of June 14 residents were put on alert that water might be shut off, due to the possibility of flood waters reaching the treatment plant along the riverfront, however, on the morning of June 15, it was stated that the plant would not be affected, unless the river were to crest at, or above the  mark, which, according to records, has not happened in well over a century, and not since the recent water treatment plant had been built.

Burlington's newspaper, The Hawk-Eye, remained in operation throughout the flood, despite its close proximity to the Mississippi River.  It has never stopped publication in its history.

One of two major highways that serve the Burlington area, U.S. Highway 61, was closed off just south of the city, near the county line.  On July 19, 2008, the Great River Bridge, connecting Highway 34 west with Illinois officially re-opened after being closed for nearly a month. The Great River bridge is an important connection to Illinois, because nearly 40% of Burlington's workforce lives in nearby Illinois, also, several Burlington residents work in cities in Illinois.

The early morning of June 15 saw a section of Main Street, between Division Street, and Jefferson Street blocked off, due to the rising flood waters.

The entire length of County Highway 99, from the city limits, to the northern county line, was blocked off, due to the rising flood waters, and a break along a levee on the Iowa River near Oakville (the road had already been blocked off near the northern county line, due to construction).

By the morning of June 15, several streets had been closed, making travel difficult, among them were, Front Street, running the entire length of the road, Main Street, between Division Street, and Jefferson Street, Mill Dam Road, Tama Road, and all of its side roads, U.S. Highway 61, and County Highway 99, by the morning of June 17, Main Street had been blocked off even further, extending another block to the south, and Division Street had been blocked off up to Third Street, along with Jefferson Street, and Valley Street.

By June 15, Lock and Dam 18, north of the city, had stated that if the river does not begin to recede soon, they would be forced to open the flood gates, due to the possibility of the river topping over the dam.

On the morning of June 15, the Stevenson Lake levee, near Gulfport, Illinois gave way, bringing the depth of the river down somewhat, but completely obliterating the small town of 200, which lay directly across the river in Illinois.

As of July 23, 2008, the city of Gulfport, IL remains under water. Because Gulfport sits below the Mississippi river level, Gulfport will need to be drained using pumps. Many businesses and homes are steadily decaying or are already destroyed.

As August drew to a close, Gulfport had been pumped out, the complete obliteration of several buildings, including The Beverage Mart was noticeable, these buildings would be demolished later on, as of September 23, no plans have been made on reconstruction.

The town didn't see any help until the following summer, when several construction companies finally were allowed into the area, which had been blocked off by the Illinois State Police, and the Henderson County Sheriff's office.

In September 2008, the area, once again, became the victim of massive flooding, as a spillway off the river, known as Flint Creek, as well as a small pool area, known as Dumbbell Lake, jumped their banks, after a week of hard rain, caused by the remnants of Hurricane Ike. Tama Road was severely damaged due to the raging flood waters, and was caught on both sides of the road. The flood was so severe, that the earthen embankments eroded, and the concrete road bed fractured, and crumbled, causing widespread damage over the two mile length of the road. As of December 2008, the road remains closed due to massive damage. In several areas along County Highway 99, the flood waters came against the high embankments, making the fields on the east side of the road appear to be nothing more than a large lake area for an estimated five miles, the flooding could also be seen along certain areas of U.S. Highway 61, at the north end of town. Although neither highway was flooded out, or closed, the damage was noticeable, especially where County Highway 99 was at its most vulnerable, two of the four piers constructed for a new bridge near the northern county line were knocked over by the water, and had to be rebuilt. As of December 2009, Tama Road still remains unpaved, with gravel filling in the areas where the old concrete road bed had given out. In the areas where the road had been destroyed, a difference in road height of three feet, or more is instantly noticeable. Continuing arguments between the Burlington City Council, and the Des Moines County Board of Supervisors over responsibility of the road prevents any repairs from taking place (in the mid-1970s, the city had paved the road in concrete, taking responsibility from the county, the city's argument is that the road sits outside of the city limits, and therefore, the county is responsible). Finally, in  early 2010, after a final winter thaw eroded the roadbed even further, completely destroying what was left of the road, the state stepped in, and took over the reconstruction, billing the city for their services. The road was opened later that same year, completely repaved, and set with a new waterproof concrete roadbed, and several new drainage culverts.

Media response
The local TV news stations went to wall-to-wall coverage starting Wednesday, June 11. KGAN-TV (CBS, channel 2) and KCRG-TV (ABC, channel 9), in Cedar Rapids, and KWWL-TV, (NBC, channel 7), in Waterloo all stayed on air giving local coverage, preempting network programs, even to include preempting the network evening news program. KCRG moved ABC's coverage of Game 4 of the 2008 NBA Finals to its digital subchannel, while KWWL broadcast NBC's coverage of the 2008 U.S. Open Golf Championship.  Stations resumed airing regular programming June 15.

Des Moines television stations aired all local coverage during the day on Friday, June 13. WHO-TV left briefly to allow NBC to announce the death of Tim Russert. After the Des Moines flood threat proved to be not as bad as once thought, stations returned to regular programming that evening.

KCRG and The Gazette, both owned by Gazette Communications and located adjacent to each other in downtown Cedar Rapids, continued to operate out of their respective newsrooms despite the nearby flooding and loss of electricity. The Gazette's editor at the time, Steve Buttry, officially began his duties just two days before waters rose above flood stage in Cedar Rapids.

At about 9:30 p.m. on Monday, June 16, KWWL went off the air due to a small electrical fire in the studio.  An electrical motor in the ventilation system caught fire and sent smoke through the building.  There were no injuries and hardly any damage.  They resumed broadcasts at about 1:00 a.m. on Tuesday, June 17.

Public health

Just after midnight, central time, June 13, Mercy Medical Center in Cedar Rapids began evacuating its patients from the facility. It is understood they could not further function under the emergency circumstances. The evacuation was completed by about 8:20 a.m.

Public Health Hazards: Physical and Mental
The main public health hazard was the polluted water, mixed with the outflow of overwhelmed sanitary sewer systems, petroleum products and a variety of other toxic materials, to include asbestos. As the waters recede, tremendous amounts of potentially infectious debris added to the problem; this included uncollected garbage and dead animals. This issue was exacerbated by the onset of the hot and humid summer weather. Just making the affected areas sanitary again was a huge undertaking. The problem of mold propagating in flooded buildings was one of major concern.

Contact with polluted water and flood soaked item can cause rashes, and if it comes in contact with a skin cut, a variety of infections. Public officials warned of a potential increase in waterborne diseases such as dysentery as well as an increased population of mosquitoes, which can carry West Nile virus.

Free tetanus shots were being offered in many areas, including Cedar Rapids and Iowa City.

In addition to physical disease, residents were warned of potential mental health problems. Parents were told to expect developmental regressions in child survivors of the flood, especially those who lost their homes. Even in adults, the stress of applying for services and managing daily activities under catastrophic conditions was expected to exacerbate pre-existing anxiety, depression, or family conflict. The physical and emotional stress of cleaning out flooded homes was only part of the trouble, as parents needed to manage all of this while still caring for children who were home on summer vacation. All of this was compounded by the summer heat & humidity, mosquitos and biting gnats, and the sheer number of people facing the same circumstances. Long-term consequences were possible as well. "Once the original shock and dismay pass, the losses of such things as wedding photos or treasured family heirlooms can lead to depression and even post-traumatic stress disorder," said one official.

Some rural areas suffered from a lack of access to badly-needed public and social services, and agencies were overwhelmed with the increase of people needing assistance. Also, due to the large area of the Midwest affected by this event, some rivers and tributaries took an abnormally long time to recede, with some areas remaining flooded for up to four weeks. The increased amount of standing water and flood-affected ground caused a summer-long increased population of biting midge gnats (sand flies), fungus gnats, flies, and mosquitoes, with the above-mentioned public health concerns.

FEMA trailer problems
Problems arose in trailers provided by FEMA to residents displaced by this flood . Several months after moving to the trailers, occupants reported violent coughing, headaches, as well as asthma, bronchitis, and other problems. Tests showed that in some trailers, levels of formaldehyde exceeded the limits recommended by the U.S. Environmental Protection Agency and American Lung Association. The associated publicity resulted in additional testing being planned to begin in November 2008.

Recovery
Comparison has been made to the Grand Forks, North Dakota, 1997 Red River flood, Hurricane Katrina, and the Great Flood of 1993 and the lesson to be learned is that full recovery will take at least ten years, and that the political and private establishments will have to put aside territorial one-ups-man-ship and co-operate in making some decisions that will be decidedly unpopular.

To assist in recovery efforts, a web site has been site up.  Save Iowa was established to help flood victims as there is a tremendous need for donations all across Iowa. Save Iowa makes it easy for people around the country to donate to the flood relief cause of their choice.

In response to the Iowa flood of 2008, the Iowa Legislature established the Iowa Flood Center as a part of the University of Iowa in 2009.

FEMA trailers and formaldehyde
A couple months after the June floods, Iowa flood victims reported violent coughing, headaches, and conditions such as asthma, bronchitis, and other health issues worsening since moving into the trailers. KGAN-TV out of Cedar Rapids tested 20 trailers in the Cedar Rapids area under contract with a nationally certified chemical testing company, with testing kits finding unsafe levels of formaldehyde in six of them, according to Environmental Protection Agency and American Lung Association limits, which are more stringent than FEMA's or Iowa's standards.

After KGAN airing their results, intervention from Iowa Governor Chet Culver, and increasing concerns from residents, FEMA held a meeting in Cedar Rapids with residents, despite denying to intervene with the reports. FEMA will now retest trailers upon request, starting early November.

See also
June 2008 Midwest floods

References

External links

 Former Iowan blogs back to his flooded homeland
 Iowa Flood News Blog Aggregator

2008 floods in the United States
Flood
Floods in the United States
History of Cedar Rapids, Iowa
Natural disasters in Iowa
June 2008 events in the United States